Louis Arnett Stuart Bellinger (September 29, 1891, in Sumter, South Carolina – February 3, 1946, in Pittsburgh, Pennsylvania) was an American architect responsible for the design of significant buildings in and near Pittsburgh.

Life and work 
Bellinger earned a bachelor's degree in architecture from Howard University in 1914. Upon graduation, he moved to Philadelphia, and then shortly afterward taught mathematics in Florida and at Allen University in South Carolina. He served in the U.S. Army in 1917, training at Fort Des Moines. In 1919 Bellinger relocated to Pittsburgh with his wife Ethel, who taught music (initially privately and eventually at the Robert L. Vann Elementary School). 

In the early and mid-1920s, Bellinger worked in the office of the City Architect of Pittsburgh, designing buildings including a police station, service buildings in city parks, and most notably, a baseball field called Central Park. In 1926, he established a private practice, and among his first designs that year was the African Methodist Episcopal Book Concern at 716 S. 19th. St., Philadelphia (now demolished).  At the time, he was one of fewer than sixty African-American architects.

In the late 1920s and 1930s, Bellinger created many important buildings in Pittsburgh, including the New Granada Theater in the Hill District, originally designed for the Knights of Pythias. This building still stands and was added to the List of City of Pittsburgh historic designations on October 8, 2004, the List of Pittsburgh History and Landmarks Foundation Historic Landmarks in 2007, and the National Register of Historic Places on December 27, 2010. In 1931, Bellinger designed Greenlee Field for Gus Greenlee, used by Negro league baseball teams.  Other Pittsburgh designs by Bellinger include his and Ethel's duplex at 530 Francis St., apartment complexes on Centre Ave. and Wylie Ave., and remodelings of churches in Wilkinsburg and East Liberty.

In 1932, Bellinger ran as a Republican for United States Congress. The only black candidate (of five) on Pennsylvania's 32nd congressional district ballot, he was not elected.

In the late 1930s, Bellinger folded his private practice and for several years worked for the city as a building inspector.  In 1945 and 1946, he created several new designs and remodels of public and private buildings.  

Bellinger died of a cerebral hemorrhage on February 3, 1946.  He is buried in Allegheny Cemetery.

Albert M. Tanner notes Bellinger's importance: "References to Louis A. S. Bellinger are found in Negro Artists: An Illustrated Review of Their Achievements (New York: Harmon Foundation, 1935), Theresa Dickason Cederholm, Afro-American Artists: A Bio-bibliographical Directory (Boston Public Library, 1973), and Who Was Who in American Art 1564-1975 (Madison, CT: Sound View Press, 1999). A detailed account of his life and work appears in African-American Architects: A Biographical Dictionary 1865-1945 (New York: Routledge, 2004)."

References 
 Albert M. Tannler: "Pittsburgh's African-American Architect Louis Bellinger and the New Granada Theater." Pittsburgh History & Landmarks Foundation. May 7, 2006. http://www.phlf.org/education-department/pittsburghs-african-american-architect-louis-bellinger-and-the-new-granada-theater/

Resources 

Howard University alumni
1891 births
1946 deaths
20th-century American architects
African-American architects
Burials at Allegheny Cemetery